In Vitro Cellular & Developmental Biology is a peer-reviewed scientific journal covering all aspects of in vitro biology. It was originally established as In Vitro in 1965, acquiring its current name in 1983. In 1991, In Vitro Cellular & Developmental Biology – Plant was created, with the original section renaming itself In Vitro Cellular & Developmental Biology – Animal in 1993. The journals are published by Springer Science+Business Media on behalf of the Society for In Vitro Biology.

According to the Journal Citation Reports, in 2020, the animal section of the journal had an impact factor of 2.416, while the Plant had an impact factor of 2.252.

References

External links
 - Animal section
 - Plant section
Society for In Vitro Biology
International Association of Plant Biotechnology

English-language journals
Publications established in 1965
Molecular and cellular biology journals
Springer Science+Business Media academic journals
Bimonthly journals